PLCC may refer to:

 Plastic leaded chip carrier
 Power line carrier communication
 Pearson's linear correlation coefficient
 Private-label credit card